The C class was a class of 32 destroyers of the Royal Navy that were launched from 1943 to 1945. The class was built in four flotillas of 8 vessels, the "Ca", "Ch", "Co" and "Cr" groups or sub-classes, ordered as the 11th, 12th, 13th and 14th Emergency Flotillas respectively. The sub-class names are derived from the initial 2 letters of the member ships' names, although the "Ca" class were originally ordered with a heterogeneous mix of traditional destroyer names. A fifth flotilla, the "Ce" or 15th Emergency Flotilla, was planned but were cancelled in favour of the s after only the first two ships had been ordered. The pennant numbers were all altered from "R" superior to "D" superior at the close of World War II; this involved some renumbering to avoid duplications.

Design
They were built as part of the War Emergency Programme, based on the hull and machinery of the pre-war J class, incorporating whatever advances in armament and naval radar were available at the time. Some of the class were completed in time for wartime service.  All ships used the Fuze Keeping Clock High Angle Fire Control Computer.

The "Ca" flotilla were generally repeats of the preceding Z class, and as such had a main gun armament of four QF  Mk IV guns on Mk V mounts, which could elevate to 55 degrees to give an anti-aircraft capability. Close-in anti-aircraft armament generally consisted of two 40mm Bofors guns in a twin stabilized Hazemayer mount, supplemented by four single 2-pounder "pom-pom" anti aircraft guns on power operated mounts. Caprice differed in having a quadruple 2-pounder "pom-pom" instead of the Hazemayer Bofors mount, while Cassandra had eight Oerlikon 20 mm cannon instead of the single pom-poms. Torpedo armament consisted of eight  torpedoes in two quadruple mounts, while 70 depth charges could be carried.

The succeeding "Ch", "Co" and "Cr" flotillas were fitted with the new Mk VI HA/LA Director instead of the Mk I Type K director of the Z and Ca classes, while remote power control (RPC) gunlaying equipment was fitted. The additional weight of the new fire control equipment and the powered mountings for the 4.5 inch guns meant that only one quadruple torpedo mount was fitted, and the depth charge armament was reduced to 35 depth charges.  Most of the ships were fitted with a single Hazemayer Bofors mount, although some of the later ships instead had the lighter and simpler Mk V twin Bofors mount. This was normally supplemented by two power operated single pom-pom mounts and two 20 mm Oerlikon cannon. They also introduced the all-welded hull into Royal Navy destroyer construction, beginning in Contest, with the "Cr" flotilla all being of all-welded construction. Late delivery of the Mk VI directors delayed completion such that all but one of the "Ch"s, "Co"s or "Cr"s entered service after the end of the Second World War. Only Comet was commissioned before VJ Day, in June 1945, albeit too late to see action.

Caprice was the last destroyer built for the Royal Navy to be fitted with the ubiquitous quadruple QF 2 pounder "pom-pom" mounting Mark VII.

The "Ca" flotilla were reconstructed in the late 1950s and early 1960s to be modernised for anti-submarine warfare and to serve as fast fleet escorts. One bank of torpedo tubes and one 4.5 in gun was removed, allowing two Squid triple-barreled anti-submarine mortars to be fitted, while the ships' obsolete gun Mk I Type K director was replaced by a modern Mk 6M director as fitted to Royal Navy frigates, and the remaining 4.5 in guns fitted with RPC. Close in anti-aircraft armament was standardised as a single Mk V twin and two single 40 mm Bofors mounts. The ships were also fitted with new bridges; the post-refit bridge differed between the first four conversions (Cavendish, Carron, Cavalier and Carysfort), with open bridges and the later four (Caprice, Cassandra, Caesar and Cambrian) which were given frigate-type enclosed bridges.

The remaining "Ch", "Co" and Cr" ships in the Royal Navy were given a less extensive modernisation, with one 4.5 in gun being replaced by twin Squids, modified fire control and a close in anti aircraft armament of 1 twin and four single Bofors guns. Chieftain, Chaplet and Comet were fitted as minelayers.

Engineering
All were engined by their builders except Cossack and Constance, which were engined by Parsons.

Ships

"Ca" (or 11th Emergency) Flotilla

This flotilla was authorised under the 1941 Programme. The first pair was ordered from Yarrow on 16 February 1942; the other six were ordered on 24 March, a pair each from John Brown, Scotts and Cammell Laird. However, on 12 August 1942 the contract for the last pair was moved from Cammell Laird to White. Their originally-allocated names were altered to new names beginning with "Ca-" in November 1942. The John Brown pair - Caesar and Cavendish - were fitted as Leaders.

On completion they formed the 6th Destroyer Flotilla for service in the Home Fleet. At the end of the war in Europe the flotilla was transferred to the East Indies Fleet and the ships arrived on station between August and November 1945, too late to see service against Japan. They remained in the Indian Ocean until May 1946 when they returned home and paid off into operational reserve.

"Ch" (or 12th Emergency) Flotilla

Six destroyers, the first of 26 'Intermediate' destroyers to be authorised under the 1942 Programme, were ordered on 24 July 1942, a pair each from Thornycroft, Scotts and Alexander Stephen. The fourth pair was originally intended to be ordered from Vickers Armstrongs, Walker-on-Tyne, but instead were ordered from Denny on 30 July. The Chequers and Childers were fitted as Leaders.

"Co" (or 13th Emergency) Flotilla

The first four of these destroyers were ordered in August 1942 - Comus and Concord on 7th, Contest on 12th and Consort on 14th. The remaining four destroyers were ordered on 12 September; Constance and Cossack were fitted as Leaders.

"Cr" (or 14th Emergency) Flotilla

All eight destroyers were ordered on 12 September 1942, two each from John Brown, Yarrow, White and Scotts; the John Brown pair - Crescent and Crusader - were fitted as Leaders.

"Ce" (or 15th Emergency) Flotilla

Two ships of this putative flotilla, the last of the 26 "Intermediate"-type destroyers authorised under the 1942 Programme, were ordered on 3 February 1942 from White. These two ships were to be named Centaur and Celt. However, with the decision to introduce a fresh design of Intermediate destroyer (which became the  design), the White orders were amended to the new design and the names of the two ships were altered to Tomahawk and Sword respectively. Tomahawk was subsequently renamed again, becoming Scorpion, while Sword was finally cancelled on 15 October 1945.

Image gallery

See also
List of ship classes of the Second World War

References

Notes

Footnotes

Publications
 Maurice Cocker, Destroyers of the Royal Navy, 1893-1981, Ian Allan: London, 1981. 
 Mike Critchley, British Warships Since 1945: Part 3: Destroyers,  Maritime Books: Liskeard, UK, 1982. .
 Norman Friedman, British Destroyers & Frigates: The Second World War and After, Chatham Publishing, 
 Robert Gardiner and Roger Chesneau, Conway's All The World's Fighting Ships 1922–1946, Conway Maritime Press: London, 1980. 
 Robert Gardiner and Stephen Chumbley, Conway's All The World's Fighting Ships 1947–1995, Naval Institute Press: Annapolis, Maryland, USA, 1995. .
 David Hobbs, C Class Destroyers,  Maritime Books: Liskeard, UK, 2012. 
 Peter Hodges and Norman Friedman, Destroyer Weapons of World War 2, Naval Institute Press: Annapolis Maryland, USA, 1979. .
 H. T. Lenton, British and Empire Warships of the Second World War, Greenhill Books, 
 H. T. Lenton, Navies of the Second World War: British Fleet & Escort Destroyers Volume Two, Macdonald: London, 1970. 
 George Moore, Building for Victory: The Warship Building Programmes of the Royal Navy 1939 - 1945, World Ship Society, 
 M. J. Whitley, Destroyers of World War Two: An International Encyclopedia, Cassell and Co.: London, 2000. .

External links

 
Destroyer classes
Ship classes of the Royal Navy